Circus Girl is the fifth studio album from Australian country music artist Sherrié Austin and was released independently on November 15, 2011.

Background 
The album is portrayed as a group of tales analyzed by a powerful female, about females, and on behalf of females.  Austin felts that the work was something her female supporters have been requesting for years.

"The last few years I had been complaining about the fact that there weren’t any females speaking to women above the age of 30, so I started thinking about how I was writing my songs and came up with the idea for “Friday Night Girls" ...I wanted to write a three-minute song with every Sex and the City episode that had ever existed, so I did. I quickly noticed that the women in my audiences loved it and so I switched my songwriting focus for a while to concentrate on that audience, who are my peers, to speak to them,” says Austin.

The final track on the album, "Naughty or Nice", was co-written by Shane Stevens.

Track listing

Personnel
 Sherrié Austin - vocals
 Jim Hyatt - bass
 Joel Key - banjo, acoustic guitar, mandolin
 Wayne Killius - drums
 Mike Rojas - keyboards
 Adam Shoenfeld - electric guitar
 Shane Stevens - backing vocals
 Russell Terrell - backing vocals

References 

2011 albums
Sherrié Austin albums